Viking Line Abp is a Finnish shipping company that operates a fleet of ferries and cruiseferries between Finland, the Åland Islands, Sweden and Estonia. Viking Line shares are quoted on the Helsinki Stock Exchange. Viking Line is operated from Åland.

Company history

Early years: 1959–1966 
Viking Line's history can be traced back to 1959, when a group of sea- and businessmen from the Åland Islands province in Finland formed Rederi Ab Vikinglinjen, purchased a steam-powered car-ferry SS Dinard from the UK, renamed her  and began service on the route Korpo (Finland)–Mariehamn (Åland)–Gräddö (Sweden). In the same year the Gotland-based Rederi AB Slite began a service between Simpnäs (Sweden) and Mariehamn.

In 1962, a disagreement caused a group of people to leave Rederi Ab Vikinglinjen and form a new company, Rederi Ab Ålandsfärjan, who began a service linking Gräddö and Mariehamn the following year.

Soon the three companies, all competing for passengers between Åland Islands and Sweden, realised that they in the long run all stood to lose from mutual competition. In 1965 Vikinglinjen and Slite began collaborating, and in the end of July 1966 Viking Line was established as a marketing company for all three companies. At this time Rederi Ab Vikinglinjen changed their name to Rederi Ab Solstad, in order to avoid confusion with the marketing company. The red hull livery was adopted from Slite's Ålandspilen service (to which it had been taken from the colour of the chairman's wife's lipstick!). In 1967 Rederi Ab Ålandsfärjan changed its name to SF Line and in 1977 Rederi Ab Solstad was merged into its mother company Rederi Ab Sally.

1967–1985 
Because Viking Line was only a marketing company, each owner company retained their individual fleets and could choose on which routes to set their ships (naturally there was also co-ordination on schedules and such). Each company's ships were easy to distinguish by name: all Sally ships had a "Viking" prefix on their names, Slite took their names from Roman and Greek mythologies, while SF Line's names ended with -ella in honor of managing director Gunnar Eklund's wife Ellen Eklund.

During the 1970s Viking expanded greatly and overtook Silja Line as the largest shipping consortium on the Northern Baltic Sea. Between 1970 and 1973 Slite and Sally took delivery of five nearly identical ships built at Meyer Werft Germany, namely MS Apollo and MS Diana for Slite, and MS Viking 1, MS Viking 3 and MS Viking 4 for Sally. MS Viking 5, delivered in 1974, was an enlargened version of the same design. These so-called Papenburg sisters can be considered to be one of the most successful ships designs of all times (the shipyard built three additional sisters of the original design for Transbordadores for ship services in Mexico: Coromuel, Puerto Vallarta and Azteca). In 1973 Viking Line started service on the Turku–Mariehamn–Stockholm route, directly competing with Silja Line for the first time. The next year Sally began Viking Line traffic between Helsinki and Stockholm. For the next decade this route stayed in their hands, whereas on other routes the three companies operated together.

By the latter half of the 1970s, Sally was clearly the dominant partner in the consortium. In 1980 they took delivery of three new ferries (MS Viking Saga, MS Viking Sally and MS Viking Song), largest to have sailed under Viking's colours. This further established their dominance over the other partners, although SF Line did take delivery of the new MS Turella and MS Rosella in 1979–80 and Slite MS Diana II in 1979. In the early 1980s Sally started expanding their operations to other waters, which became the company's failing as those operations were largely unprofitable and ultimately made Sally unable to invest on new tonnage for Viking Line service.

1985–1993 
In 1985 a new leaf was turned in Viking Line's history when SF Line's brand-new MS Mariella, at the time the largest ferry in the world, replaced MS Viking Song on Helsinki–Stockholm service, breaking Sally's monopoly on the route. The next year Slite took delivery of Mariella's sister MS Olympia and thus forced Sally out of Helsinki–Stockholm traffic completely. While SF Line and Slite were planning additional newbuilds, Sally were in an extremely poor position financially and in 1987 Effoa and Johnson Line, the owners of Silja Line, purchased Sally. As a result, SF Line and Slite forced Sally to leave the Viking Line consortium.

Between 1988 and 1990 SF Line took delivery of three new ships (MS Amorella, MS Isabella and MS Cinderella) while Slite took delivery of two (MS Athena and MS Kalypso).Unfortunately Wärtsilä Marine, the shipyard building one of SF Line's newbuilds and both of Slite's, went bankrupt in 1989. SF Line avoided financial repercussions, their Cinderella had been continuously paid for as her construction progressed. Hence it was SF Line who owned the almost completed ship when the shipyard went bankrupt. Slite however had signed a more traditional type of contract, the Kalypso was to be paid for on delivery. Since the shipyard owned the unfinished ship, this led to an increased cost for the Kalypso—about 200 million SEK more than had been originally envisaged. In the end, despite the financial problems, by 1990 Viking Line had the largest and newest cruiseferry fleet in the world.

In 1989 Slite started planning MS Europa, which was to be the jewel in the company's crown, the largest and most luxurious cruiseferry in the world. Unfortunately for them Sweden entered a financial crisis during the construction of the ship, which led to devaluation of the Swedish krona. This in turn meant that the cost for the Europa increased by 400 million SEK. When time came to take delivery of the new ship, Slite did not have the funds to pay for it and their main funders (Swedish Nordbanken, who were also the main funders of Silja Line) refused to loan them the money needed. Eventually the ship ended up in Silja Line's fleet and Slite was forced to declare bankruptcy in 1993.

1993–2010 
Following the bankruptcy of Rederi AB Slite, SF Line was left as the sole operator under the Viking Line brand. The remaining two Slite ships, Athena and Kalypso were auctioned in August 1993. SF Line made a bid for the Kalypso, but both ships ended up sold to the newly established Malaysian cruise ship operator Star Cruises. In 1995 SF Line changed their name into Viking Line.

Between 1994 and 1996 the company operated a fast ferry service from Helsinki to Tallinn during the summers on chartered catamaran ships. In 1997 they purchased MS Silja Scandinavia from Sea-Link Shipping AB and renamed her  for Helsinki–Stockholm service. It has been reported that around the same time plans were made to construct a pair of new ships for the Helsinki–Stockholm service so that Viking could better compete with Silja on that route, but the plans were shelved.

Viking Line placed a bid for their main competitor, but were outbid by the Estonian Tallink.

The first new ship built for Viking Line since Slite's MS Kalypso in 1990, had been ordered from Aker Finnyards in 2005, in response to growing competition from Tallink on the Helsinki–Tallinn route. The Viking XPRS eventually entered service for Viking in April 2008. A second new ship was ordered in January 2007, when Viking Line announced that they had placed an order for a  ferry at the Spanish shipyard Astilleros de Sevilla. Her delivery was originally expected for March 2009, but after delivery of the ship had been delayed multiple times, on 8 February 2010 Viking Line decided to cancel the contract altogether.

2010–present 
Nils-Erik Eklund retired as Viking Line's CEO in July 2010. He was replaced by Mikael Backman, who has previously worked with Royal Caribbean. In interviews Backman has stated he hopes to introduce features from Caribbean cruise ships to Viking Line vessels, as well as begin selling Viking's routes to North American customers as a new cruise experience.

In a seminar held in January 2010, Backman stated that Viking Line were negotiating with nine different shipyards about the possibility of constructing a pair of  ships to replace Amorella and Isabella on the Turku–Stockholm service. The possibility of using liquefied natural gas engines and other emission-reducing technologies were reportedly researched, while according to Mikael Backman the ships would include various features akin to those found onboard cruise ships such as Royal Caribbean International's . Projected delivery dates for the vessels were May 2012 and February 2013.

In October 2010 Viking Line signed a letter of intent with STX Turku for a 57,000 GT cruiseferry for the Turku–Stockholm route. Two months later, the formal order for the new ship was placed. The new ship, christened Viking Grace, was laid down on 6 March 2012 and launched on 10 August. The ship entered service in January 2013. Viking Line had an option for a sister ship but announced in May 2012 that they have decided not to build it.

Viking Line revealed in November 2016, that a letter of intent had been signed with Chinese shipyard Xiamen Shipbuilding for the construction of a 63,000 GT cruiseferry that would on completion replace the Amorella in the Viking Line fleet. The new ship would be LNG powered and would sport Flettner rotors to reduce fuel consumption.

Ville Viking

Ville Viking is the mascot of Viking Line, which is used as an icon for activities for children passengers, marketing and merchandising. The white ship's cat figure appears on ships and Viking Line's marketing events at least in Finland and Sweden. The feline figure can be hugged and can appear in pictures with people.

The name of the Viking Line children's club is Ville Viking Club. Children under 12 years of age can join the club free of charge, and members receive a mail letter twice per year. The club has its own cruises from Turku once per week and from Helsinki once per month except for the summer holiday season.

Alcohol-free Ville Viking drinks can be bought on Viking Line's ships. Children's menus and buffet tables on the ships are also named for the character.

In 2007 a CD of children's songs was published under the Ville Viking name.

Fleet

Current fleet

Former ships 
Ships that are still in use are marked in green.

Additionally a large number of ferries were chartered during the 1970s, 1980s and 1990s for seasonal traffic.

Ordered but never delivered 
{| class="wikitable"
! Planned/project name || Projected delivery || Ordered by || Tonnage || Notes || Fate
|-
| MS Europa ||align="Center" | 1993 ||align="Center" | Rederi AB Slite ||  || Building project was almost complete when Rederi AB Slite went bankrupt. She was then completed for Silja Line as MS Silja Europa in 1993. || In Tallink service.
|-
| MS Viking ADCC ||align="Center" | 2009 ||align="Center" | Viking Line ||  || Building project cancelled by Viking Line due to Seville shipyard's inability to complete the ship on time. || Hull was transferred to another shipyard in Vigo, where it was finished and delivered to Trasmediterránea as MS Villa de Teror in July 2019,10 years after original delivery date. 
|-
| MS Hansa Express|| align="Center" | 1962 ||align="Center" | Rederi Ab Vikinglinjen ||  || Completed for Finnlines as MS Hansa Express, 1962. || Scrapped 2003.
|-
|}

 Terminals 
Viking Line has seven terminals, of which four are in Finland (two in mainland Finland and two in Åland), two in Sweden and one in Estonia.

Finland
 Helsinki: Katajanokka Terminal. Served by Helsinki tram lines 4 and 5.
 Turku: Linnansatama. Served by the Port of Turku railway station and bus line 1. 
 Mariehamn: Västhamnen. Served by the Mariehamn city bus.
 Lumparland: Långnäs.

Sweden
 Stockholm: Stadsgården. Served by a terminal bus line and the city ship Emelie''.
 Gräddö: Kapellskär. Served by a bus line from Stockholm.

Estonia
 Tallinn: Reisisadam. Served by Tallinn bus line 1 and tram lines 1 and 2.

See also 
Finnish maritime cluster
List of companies of Finland
Viking

References

External links 

  
 

Ferry companies of Finland
Companies listed on Nasdaq Helsinki
Transport companies established in 1963
Cruise lines
Companies of Åland